South Carolina Highway 201 (SC 201) is a  state highway in the U.S. state of South Carolina. The highway travels through rural areas of Abbeville and Anderson counties, and does not travel through any cities or towns. Virtually all of the highway is in Abbeville County with only a small portion,  of the highway's total length, at the northern end in Anderson County.

Route description
SC 201 begins at an intersection with SC 20 (Greenville Street) north of Abbeville, within Abbeville County. It travels to the north-northwest and crosses over Reid Creek. After a crossing of Park Creek is one over Little River. Then, it intersects with SC 184 southwest of Due West. At the intersection with Troy Murdock Road, the highway enters Anderson County. Approximately  later, it meets its northern terminus, an intersection with SC 284 (Trail Road). This intersection is north-northeast of Antreville. Here, the roadway continues as Level Land Road.

Major intersections

See also

References

External links

SC 201 at Virginia Highways' South Carolina Highways Annex

201
Transportation in Abbeville County, South Carolina
Transportation in Anderson County, South Carolina